The Australasian bittern (Botaurus poiciloptilus), also known as the brown bittern or matuku hūrepo, and also nicknamed the "bunyip bird", is a large bird in the heron family Ardeidae. A secretive bird with a distinctive booming call, it is more often heard than seen. Australasian bitterns are endangered in both Australia and New Zealand.

Taxonomy
German zoologist Johann Georg Wagler described the Australasian bittern in 1827. It is one of four similarly-plumaged species in the genus Botaurus.

Description
The length is from 650 to 750 mm with adults being similar between the sexes while the male is significantly larger. The bird has a deep brown upper surface, mauled with buff on wing coverts; face and eyebrow buff, with dark brown stripe running from bill to erectile plumes at sides of neck. Under surface buff, striped with brown. The face skin is a dull green as are the legs and feet, it possesses a dark brown bill, yellow eyes, and the base of the lower mandible is green-yellow.

Behaviour
It feeds on aquatic animals such as frogs, eels and freshwater crustaceans.  It is a solitary nester on the ground in dense wetland vegetation on trampled reeds and other plants. Monitoring of this species mainly relies upon the ability to count males based on the conspicuous breeding calls of males. Detailed analyses showed that the best time to detect Australasian Bitterns was 1 hour before sunrise, in September (austral spring), on a moonlit night with no cloud or rain.

Distribution and habitat
It is found in south-western and south-eastern Australia, Tasmania, New Zealand, New Caledonia and Ouvea.  Populations in Australia and New Zealand have declined in the 20th century. It is a cryptic and partly nocturnal species that inhabits densely vegetated wetlands.

Status and conservation
The principal cause of past and present decline is thought to be wetland drainage and degradation.  In Australia it is thought to be particularly sensitive to the destruction of drought refugia. It is listed as endangered on the Environment Protection and Biodiversity Conservation Act 1999. It is listed as threatened on the Victorian Flora and Fauna Guarantee Act of 1988.  Under this act, an Action Statement for the recovery and future management of this species has not been prepared.  On the 2007 advisory list of threatened vertebrate fauna in Victoria, this species is listed as endangered.

Important bird areas
BirdLife International has identified the following sites, all of which are in Australia, as being important for Australasian bittern conservation:

New South Wales
 Fivebough and Tuckerbil Swamps
 Griffith Wetlands
 Gwydir Wetlands
 Hastings-Macleay
 Hunter Estuary
 Macquarie Marshes
 Narran Wetlands

Tasmania
 Egg Islands

Victoria
 Barmah-Millewa
 Bellarine Wetlands
 Carrum Wetlands (Edithvale-Seaford Wetlands and Eastern Treatment Plant)
 Discovery Bay to Piccaninnie Ponds
 Lower Brodribb River
 North Victorian Wetlands
 Yambuk
 Tootgarook Swamp

South Australia
 Coorong
 Gulf St Vincent
 Lake Hawdon System
 Lakes Alexandrina and Albert

Western Australia
 Benger Swamp
 Lake Pleasant View System
 Muir-Unicup Wetlands
 Owingup Swamp and Boat Harbour Wetlands
 Two Peoples Bay and Mount Manypeaks

Gallery

References

External links
 Radio New Zealand Our Changing World programme "Booming Bitterns", 3 February 2016
 Australasian bitterns discussed on Radio NZ Critter of the Week, 4 Dec 2015

Australasian bittern
Birds of Oceania
Endangered fauna of Australia
Australasian bittern